Title to Murder is a 2001 American action romantic comedy independent film directed by Stephen Furst and starring Maureen McCormick and Christopher Atkins. Based on a story by C. Lee Tocci, it had its world premiere on May 15, 2001 at the Cannes Film Festival.

Plot summary
While researching an ordinary real estate transaction, title examiner Leah Farrell (McCormick) discovers a property transfer document with the forged name of a missing woman, and proceeds to investigate. When she is threatened by gangsters for snooping around, she turns for help to Assistant District Attorney Paul Shaughnessy (Atkins). As Paul tries to protect Leah from the danger that looms from all sides, romance blooms. The two of them foil the plot to bring illegal gambling activities to a small seaside town in Massachusetts.

Cast
Maureen McCormick as Leah Farrell
Christopher Atkins as Paul Shaughnessy
Laurie Gould as Rose
Fredrick Burton as Everett Kincaid
Tom Seiler as Tom Baxter
Rachel Palleschi as Stacy
Ted Garland as Agt. Bonner

External links
 
 
 Title to Murder at Amazon.com

2001 films
2000s romantic action films
2001 romantic comedy films
American independent films
American romantic action films
American romantic comedy films
Films shot in Massachusetts
2000s English-language films
Films directed by Stephen Furst
2000s American films